Randall C. Pfund (born December 29, 1951) is an American former National Basketball Association (NBA) head coach and executive.  He was an assistant coach for the Los Angeles Lakers under Pat Riley and Mike Dunleavy, and was the team's head coach during the 1992–93 and 1993–94 seasons, although he was let go near the end of his second season, being replaced for the remainder of the year by Magic Johnson. 

He was the general manager for the Miami Heat from 1995 until September 29, 2008. However, he served mostly in an advisory role to Riley, who as team president (and also head coach from 1995 to 2003 and from 2005 to 2008) had the final say in basketball matters.

Pfund played college basketball at Wheaton College, where he amassed a cumulative scoring average of well over double figures, averaging nearly 25 points per game in his senior season.

His father, Lee Pfund, pitched for the Brooklyn Dodgers in 1945 and was his college coach at Wheaton.

References

External links
 BasketballReference: Randy Pfund

1951 births
Living people
American men's basketball players
Basketball coaches from Illinois
Basketball players from Illinois
High school basketball coaches in the United States
Los Angeles Lakers assistant coaches
Los Angeles Lakers head coaches
Miami Heat executives
National Basketball Association general managers
Sportspeople from Miami Beach, Florida
Sportspeople from Oak Park, Illinois
Sportspeople from Wheaton, Illinois
Wheaton Thunder men's basketball players